Abu Dawud is a common Arabic name, which may refer to:
 Abu Dawood Al-Tayalisi (c. 750 – 820), early Muslim hadith collector
 Abu Dawud (ISN 31) (born 1977), Guantanamo captive (Mahmoud Abd Al Aziz Abd Al Mujahid)
 Abu Daoud (1937–2010)